Halfworlds is a dark fantasy thriller television series produced and created by HBO Asia. Set in present-day Southeast Asia, the series reveals an underground society populated by demons from Asian folklore across the region.

The first season of Halfworlds, set in Indonesia, premiered on 29 November 2015. A second season of Halfworlds, set in Thailand, was announced in July 2016 and premiered on 22 January 2017. A third season of Halfworlds was announced in November 2019, to be set in the Philippines, with production scheduled to begin in January 2020.

Cast

 Season 1
 Salvita Decorte as Sarah
 Arifin Putra as Barata
 Reza Rahadian as Tony
 Ario Bayu as Juragan
 Bront Palarae as Gusti
 Tara Basro as Ros
 Adinia Wirasti as Nadia
 Hannah Al-Rashid as Marni
 Alex Abbad as Gorga
 Aimee Saras as Pinung
 Nathan Hartono as Coki
 Verdi Solaiman as Hasan
 Cornelio Sunny as Bandi
 Puteri Balqis as Tari

 Season 2
 Peem Jaiyen as Fyter
 Tia Tavee as Juliet Langstorm
 Emma Emika Grant as Pym
 Myra Molloy as Wish
 Arifin Putra as Barata
 Reza Rahadian as Tony
 David Asavanond as Charlie
 Jake Macapagal as Kaprey
 Charlie Ruedpokanon as Mick
 Jeeja Yanin as Thip
 Nicole Theriault as Warin
  as Yao

Episodes

Season 1
Set in the city of Jakarta, Halfworlds Season 1 lifts the veil on a parallel world of bloodthirsty creatures from Indonesian mythology who have lived amongst humans for centuries. They are known simply as "Demit" and have been carefully concealed by a powerful family of mortals. The arrival of the Gift, a mysterious supernatural event, causes this hidden world to reveal itself. As the day of the Gift draws near, Sarah, a street artist, finds herself caught between the worlds of human and Demit. Once the Demit find out who she really is, and what she must do, the delicate balance between the two worlds will be shaken forever.

The first season of Halfworlds premiered on 29 November 2015.

Season 2
In the second season of Halfworlds, a tenacious researcher named Juliet is trying to uncover the secret world of demons known as "Peesaj" that live amongst mortals in the city of Bangkok, Thailand. Armed with research by her late father, she embarks on a quest for an ancient artifact of great power. During her search, her actions draw the attention of the local Thai Peesaj.

The second season of Halfworlds premiered on 22 January 2017.

Reception

Awards
The first season received 6 nominations from the 21st Annual of Asian Television Awards.

Broadcast

References

External links
 Halfworlds – HBO Asia
 

2010s Indonesian television series
2010s Thai television series
2015 Indonesian television series debuts
2016 Indonesian television series endings
2017 Thai television series debuts
English-language television shows
Thriller television series
HBO Asia original programming